Oktyabrsky is a rural locality (a settlement) and the administrative center of Saminskoye Rural Settlement, Vytegorsky District, Vologda Oblast, Russia. The population was 22 as of 2002. There are 12 streets.

Geography 
Oktyabrsky is located 47 km north of Vytegra (the district's administrative centre) by road. Kanshino is the nearest rural locality.

References 

Rural localities in Vytegorsky District